Gilbert is a town in Searcy County, Arkansas, United States. The population was 26 at the 2020 census, ranking it as the smallest municipality in the state and one of the smallest in the nation.  Over the years, Gilbert has gained a reputation (along with Calico Rock) as one of the coldest locations in Arkansas.

History

The Gilbert community was founded in 1902 when a railroad construction camp for the Missouri and North Arkansas (M&NA) Railroad was built and named in honor of Charles W. Gilbert, secretary-treasurer of Allegheny Supply Company, which was building the railroad. The M&NA began at Seligman, MO and rambled for 303 tortuous, bloody miles to Helena, AR on the Mississippi River. In 1906, William Mays moved his store and post office to Gilbert. The Gilbert General Store, is listed on the National Register of Historic Places under the name Mays Store.

During the early 1920s, Reverend John Battenfield and his followers migrated into Gilbert and aspired to create a self-sufficient community to survive the return of the Messiah. They built a church and erected a sturdy building of smooth brown stones that was the print shop for their weekly newspaper, the Kingdom Harbinger. Gilbert Cemetery, for those who didn't make it for the anticipated Rapture, was founded in 1920 at the top of the hill on Frost Street. Gilbert School District Eighty-eight was formed in 1921. Eli Jordan donated the land for a school, the residents donated money for lumber and materials, anyone with a team and wagon hauled in the lumber, and the men of Gilbert built the school. As the town grew, it boasted four stores, two hotels, an Eagle Pencil Company mill, several sawmills and three doctors. 1923 passed without the appearance of the Messiah, and in 1925 Reverend Battenfield and his family left Gilbert to look for another location.

In the 1930s Gilbert had 116 people, its highest ever population count.

Gilbert remained a hub for commerce for several years. Cotton, logs, ore and grain came by rail. By the 1940s, unsustainable logging practices led to a decline in logging activity. The railroad suffered. The railroad tracks were soon removed and sold as scrap. Concrete pylons stand as evidence of the railroad. A portion of the former rail bed now serves as a hiking route. The Old Railroad Trail is an easy 3.4 mile round-trip hike that parallels the bank of the Buffalo River along the old M&NA railroad, with a trailhead located just past the Gilbert General Store.

Today, Gilbert is popular among canoeists for its ease of access to the scenic Buffalo River. The town contains a few homes, guest houses and cabins for rent. The Gilbert RV Campground offers RV sites, tent campsites, glamping and tube rentals. The Gilbert General Store is still in operation, providing canoe outfitter services, supplies and hunting and fishing licenses. Hiking trails, scenic overlooks and caves are abundant in the area surrounding the town. Elk can be seen grazing the pastures of the river valley. Remnants of old homesteads dot the small town, providing a hint of its past. Just a few miles from Gilbert are restaurants offering famous smoked meats, cheeses and local dishes. The Kenda Drive-In, approximately 20 miles from Gilbert in Marshall, still shows movies outdoors on its 72-foot screen. Gilbert is a town frozen in time; this will attest to the claim of being one of the coldest locations in the state. Paddlers, wildlife enthusiasts and history-lovers alike enjoy visiting the forgotten riverside community that used to be Gilbert, Arkansas.

In 2022 the community phased out its use of traditional street lights for light-emitting diode (LED) lights using high-pressure sodium. This is an anti-light pollution measure.

Geography
According to the United States Census Bureau, the town has a total area of 0.8 km2 (0.3 mi2).

Major highways
 Highway 333

School District
Gilbert is in the Ozark Mountain School District, with a K-12 campus in nearby St. Joe.

Demographics

As of the census of 2000, there were 33 people, 18 households and 10 families residing in the town. The population density was 41.1/km2 (105.1/mi2). There were 29 housing units at an average density of 36.1/km2 (92.4/mi2). The racial makeup of the town was 100.00% White.

There were 18 households, out of which 11.1% had children under the age of 18 living with them, 44.4% were married couples living together, 11.1% had a female householder with no husband present, and 44.4% were non-families. 33.3% of all households were made up of individuals, and 11.1% had someone living alone who was 65 years of age or older. The average household size was 1.83 and the average family size was 2.30.

In the town, the population was spread out, with 9.1% under the age of 18, 6.1% from 18 to 24, 18.2% from 25 to 44, 45.5% from 45 to 64 and 21.2% who were 65 years of age or older. The median age was 50 years. For every female resident, there were 1.063 males. For every female resident age 18 and over, there were 1.143 males.

The median income for a household in the town was $18,750, and the median income for a family was $20,625. Males had a median income of $28,750 versus $26,250 for females. The per capita income for the town was $15,729. There were no families and 17.1% of the population living below the poverty line, including none under the age of 18 and none of those over 64.

Climate
The climate in this area is characterized by hot, humid summers and generally mild to cool winters.  According to the Köppen Climate Classification system, Gilbert has a humid subtropical climate, abbreviated "Cfa" on climate maps.

Education
Gilbert is in the Ozark Mountain School District.

Sister cities 
  Bride, Isle of Man, United Kingdom

References

External links
 Map of Gilbert  (US Census Bureau)
 Map of Searcy County (US Census Bureau)
 Gilbert entry in the Encyclopedia of Arkansas
 Ozark Mountain School District
 Searcy County Historical Society

Towns in Searcy County, Arkansas
Towns in Arkansas
Populated places established in 1902